Figure with Meat is a 1954 painting by the Irish-born artist Francis Bacon. The figure is based on the Pope Innocent X portrait by Diego Velázquez; however, in the Bacon painting the Pope is shown as a gruesome figure and placed between two bisected halves of a cow.

The carcass hanging in the background is likely derived from Rembrandt's Slaughtered Ox, 1655. The painting is in the permanent collection of the Art Institute of Chicago.

Description

According to Mary Louise Schumacher of the Milwaukee Journal Sentinel, "Bacon appropriated the famous portrait, with its subject, enthroned and draped in satins and lace, his stare stern and full of authority. In Bacon's version, animal carcasses hang at the pope's back, creating a raw and disturbing Crucifixion-like composition. The pope's hands, elegant and poised in Velázquez's version, are rough hewn and gripping the church's seat of authority in apparent terror. His mouth is held in a scream and black striations drip down from the pope's nose to his neck.

The fresh meat recalls the lavish arrangements of fruits, meats and confections in 17th-century vanitas paintings, which usually carried subtle moralizing messages about the impermanence of life and the spiritual dangers of sensual pleasures. Sometimes, the food itself showed signs of being overripe or spoiled, to make the point. Bacon weds the imagery of salvation, worldly decadence, power and carnal sensuality, and he contrasts those things with his own far more palpable and existential view of damnation".

Influence
The painting is featured in Tim Burton's 1989 film Batman. Criminals led by the Joker break into an art museum and vandalize various works of art; but upon seeing Figure with Meat, the Joker orders it spared and left intact, remarking "I kind of like this one [...] Leave it." Craig Shaw Gardner's novelization explains that it was in that art that Joker saw "A black-and-white figure, screaming with pain and anguish and madness, a creature both pitiful and terrifying in its intensity, as if it contained all the pain and anguish and madness in the world."

Citations

External links
 Figure with Meat at The Art Institute of Chicago

1954 paintings
Paintings in the collection of the Art Institute of Chicago
Paintings by Francis Bacon
Cattle in art